Bonaiuti is an Italian surname. Notable people with the surname include:

Adriano Bonaiuti (born 1967), Italian footballer
Baldassarre Bonaiuti (1336–1385), Italian historian and politician
Mauro Bonaiuti, Italian economist

Italian-language surnames